Judge Tidwell may refer to:

George Ernest Tidwell (1931–2011), judge of the United States District Court for the Northern District of Georgia
Moody R. Tidwell III (born 1939), judge of the United States Court of Federal Claims